Pierioi is a former municipality in Pieria, Greece. The seat of the municipality was in Ritini. Since the 2011 local government reform it is part of the municipality Katerini, of which it is a municipal unit. The 2011 census recorded 2,085 residents in the municipal unit. The municipal unit has an area of 112.943 km2.

References

Populated places in Pieria (regional unit)
Katerini